British singer-songwriter Natasha Bedingfield has written and recorded songs for her own musical releases, as well as written numerous songs recorded by other artists.

Released songs

Written and recorded by Bedingfield

Written for other artists

Unreleased songs

References

Bedingfield